The House at Pooh Corner is a 1928 children's book by A. A. Milne and illustrated by E. H. Shepard. This book is the second novel, and final one by Milne, to feature Winnie-the-Pooh and his world. The book is also notable for introducing the character, Tigger. The book's exact date of publication is unknown beyond the year 1928, but it was likely during the year's end as book reviews for the book began appearing during October, 1928.

Background 
In-between the release of the 1926 Winnie-the-Pooh and this novel, Milne and Shepard released Now We Are Six. The release comprised a collection of poems, including some that featured the Pooh characters. While writing this novel, Milne decided that he wanted to end the series as Christopher Robin was getting older. The book originally retailed for $2 CAD during its initial release.

Stories 
While the stories in the book can be read independently of each other, this novel does feature a recurring theme about Christopher Robin getting older and starting education. The first is the introduction of Tigger in Chapter 2.  The plots do not carry over between stories (with the exception of Stories 8 and 9).
In Which a House is Built at Pooh Corner for Eeyore
During a snowy day, Pooh and Piglet attempt to construct a house for Eeyore. The two gather sticks from the other side of a fence to build Eeyore's house. Unbeknownst to Pooh and Piglet, Eeyore had collected those sticks during the morning so that he could build a house. During this time, Eeyore visits Christopher Robin. Upon his return, Eeyore finds that the stick pile is missing. Ultimately, Eeyore believes that the wind blew the sticks there as a house, and Pooh and Piglet are happy and leave to have lunch with Christopher Robin.
In Which Tigger Comes to the Forest and Has Breakfast
During one night, Pooh hears a mysterious sound outside his house. Upon investigation, Pooh discovers a new animal has come to the forest, Tigger. Tigger stays the night at Pooh's upon invitation. In the morning, the two share breakfast but Tigger dislikes honey. They then go to Piglet's, Eeyore's, and Christopher Robin's but they don't discover anything that Tigger likes. Finally they end up at Kanga and Roo's where Tigger discovers that he likes malt. Kanga and Roo then invite Tigger to live with them.
In Which a Search Is Organized, and Piglet Nearly Meets the Heffalump Again
Pooh is counting his honey jars when Rabbit stops by. Rabbit's relation, Small, has disappear, so Rabbit organizes a search party. As the search happens, Piglet feels frightened by potentially meeting a Heffalump. Pooh fell into a hole during the search, which Piglet later falls into. As Christopher Robin helps them to climb out, Piglet notices that Small was on Pooh's back. The search ends, but Eeyore is not notified for two days.
In Which It Is Shown That Tiggers Don't Climb Trees
While visiting together, Pooh and Piglet decide to go and see Tigger and Roo. Upon arriving at Kanga's, she explains that they are exploring the forest together. Pooh and Piglet decide to go and search for them. During this time, Roo asks what skills Tigger has, and Tigger replies that he can climb, jump, and swim. Upon reaching a tall tree, Tigger, with Roo on his back, climbs up it. However, once at the top, Tigger becomes scared and is unable to climb down. While searching, Pooh and Piglet hear sounds coming from high up, believing that it is "jagulars". They discover that it is Tigger and Roo, and the two get Christopher Robin's help. Tigger and Roo get down by jumping into Christopher Robin's extended tunic that Pooh, Piglet, Rabbit, and Eeyore hold.
In Which Rabbit Has a Busy Day, and We Learn What Christopher Robin Does in the Mornings
While trying to visit Christopher Robin, Rabbit discovers that he is gone. Rabbit takes the note that Christopher Robin left over to Owl's where the two decipher that Christopher Robin is spending time with a "Backson". Rabbit then visits Pooh who is writing poetry, and the two wonder what Christopher Robin does during the morning. Rabbit encounters Piglet who explains that he picked violets that morning, and then brought some to Eeyore. Eeyore made an "A" out of sticks, and said that Christopher Robin taught him that. This is how they learned that Christopher Robin does education during the mornings.
In Which Pooh Invents a New Game and Eeyore Joins In
While sitting on a bridge, Pooh, Piglet, Rabbit, and Roo invent a new game called "Poohsticks". The game involves dropping sticks on one side of the bridge and seeing which stick comes across first. While playing a round, Eeyore comes drifting out from under the bridge. The group helps get Eeyore out of the water, and he explains that Tigger bounced him in. Tigger denies this accusation, and states that coughed and did not bounce. Christopher Robin comes along during the argument and settles it before the group plays the game again. Tigger is very good at the game, and he teaches Eeyore his special technique. 
In Which Tigger Is Unbounced
Annoyed by Tigger's bouncing, Rabbit, along with Pooh and Piglet, concocts a scheme to get Tigger to stop. Rabbit plans to take Tigger deep into the forest and lose him so that he will then be sad and quiet and stop bouncing. However, Tigger finds his way out while Rabbit, Pooh, and Piglet are lost instead. With Christopher Robin's help, Tigger finds the trio, and Rabbit is the sad and quiet one.
In Which Piglet Does a Very Grand Thing
On a very windy day, Piglet and Pooh visit Owl. While visiting him, his tree house gets blown over by the wind trapping the trio inside. In a moment of bravery, Piglet finds a way to escape through a tiny crevice. Piglet goes off to find Christopher Robin who will help get Pooh and Owl out. While Piglet is away, Owl begins telling Pooh a story about his uncle. Pooh dozes off during the story.
In Which Eeyore Finds the Wolery, and Owl Moves into It
Due to his house falling over, Owl needs to find a new home and he solicits the help of the other animals in the forest. Eeyore had not been informed about Owl's house falling, but he goes out to search for a new one. Pooh meets with Piglet and reinforces how brave Piglet was before they meet with everyone, minus Eeyore, at Owl's house where furniture is being salvaged. Eeyore then comes along and explains that he has found Owl a new house. The house he found is actually Piglet's, but Piglet willingly gives it up. After this, Pooh offers to have Piglet move in with him, which Piglet accepts.
In Which Christopher Robin and Pooh Come to an Enchanted Place, and We Leave Them There
Christopher Robin has to leave the forest, so all of the animals sign a poem that Eeyore has written. Upon taking it to Christopher Robin he begins to read it, and as he does each animal leaves little by little until just Pooh remains. The two go off to the Enchanted Place in the forest where Christopher Robin "knights" Pooh as Sir Pooh de Bear. Christopher Robin then explains that he has to leave and he can't do "nothing" anymore, but he hopes that Pooh will come and sit in the Enchanted Place even when he's gone. Pooh promises, and the two then go off together to do something.

Reception 
The Calgary Herald gave the book a positive review, noting its continued success at capturing the same energy as the first as well as its opportunity as a Christmas gift. The Rhode Island Evening Tribune stated that the stories were "highly imaginative" ones and they "sincerely recommended" the novel. The St. Joseph Gazette also gave a positive review, claiming that "Mr. Milne and E. H. Shepard have done it again!". However, the publication did give a negative remark by stating that the book's place as the final Pooh story was "unsatisfactory". Others echoed this sentiment including The Sydney Mail who felt that Milne and Shepard should continue writing Pooh stories.

Adaptations

Musical Recordings 
In 1968 Jefferson Airplane referenced the book in their song The House at Pooneil Corners, a surrealistic depiction of global nuclear war co-written by Paul Kantner and Marty Balin, ending with the line "Which is why a Pooh is poohing in the sun".

In 1971, singer-songwriter Kenny Loggins released a song called "House at Pooh Corner" as a duet with Jim Messina on their album Sittin' In. Although the song was written by Loggins, it had previously been released by the Nitty Gritty Dirt Band on their 1970 album Uncle Charlie & His Dog Teddy. The song is told from the perspective of both Winnie-the-Pooh and Christopher Robin. The first verse, told from Pooh's point of view, describes how he and Christopher's days together "disappeared all too soon" and how he "Hates to find [his] way back to the Wood." The second verse, told from Christopher Robin's point of view, tells of how Pooh has a honey jar stuck on his nose and how he came to him asking for help, but "from here, no one knows where he goes." The song uses these verses as an allegorical musing on the loss of innocence and childhood and the nostalgia for simpler, happier times. In 1994, Loggins re-released the song as "Return to Pooh Corner" on the album of the same name. A duet with Amy Grant, this version added a third verse, told from the perspective of an adult Christopher Robin who gives Winnie-the-Pooh to his own son and hears Pooh whisper to him, "welcome home." The song ends with Christopher Robin happy that he's "finally come back to the house at Pooh Corner." This third verse was based on Loggins' own feelings of happiness after the birth of his third son. The song has since become a staple of Loggins' live performances, and it remains one of his most personal, popular and beloved songs.

Audio Recordings 
In 1960 HMV recorded a dramatised version with songs (music by Harold Fraser-Simson) of two episodes from the book (Chapters 2 and 8), starring Ian Carmichael as Pooh, Denise Bryer as Christopher Robin, Hugh Lloyd as Tigger, Penny Morrell as Piglet, Terry Norris as Eeyore, Rosemary Adam as Kanga, Tom Chatto as Rabbit and Rex Garner as Owl. This was released on a 45rpm EP.

In 1988, an audio version of the book, published by BBC Enterprises, was narrated by Alan Bennett.

In 1997 Hodder Children's Audio released a dramatisation of the book with Stephen Fry as Pooh, Sandi Toksvig as Tigger, Jane Horrocks as Piglet, Geoffrey Palmer as Eeyore, Judi Dench as Kanga, Finty Williams as Roo, Robert Daws as Rabbit, Michael Williams as Owl, Steven Webb as Christopher Robin, and narrated by Judi Dench and Michael Williams. The music was composed and played by John Gould, and directed by David Benedictus.

Film Versions 
Chapters 2, 8, and 9 were adapted into animation with the Disney featurette Winnie the Pooh and the Blustery Day. Similarly, chapters 4 and 7 were adapted into Winnie the Pooh and Tigger Too!, while chapter 6 was adapted in Winnie the Pooh and a Day for Eeyore. Chapter 8 was also partially adapted into an episode of The New Adventures of Winnie the Pooh (entitled "The Masked Offender"). Also, the final chapter was adapted as a closure to The Many Adventures of Winnie the Pooh, as well as in the direct-to-video movie Pooh's Grand Adventure: The Search for Christopher Robin in which used elements from chapter 5. However, in the book, Christopher Robin was going away to boarding school and couldn't come back but in the films he was just going to school and would come back at the end of the day, while chapters 1 and 3 were used in segments of Piglet's Big Movie.

The 2018 live-action film Christopher Robin acts as an unofficial sequel to the book, with the film focusing on a grown-up Christopher Robin meeting Pooh for the first time since going to boarding school, while the film's first scenes adapt the last chapter of the book. Producer Brigham Taylor was inspired by the book's last chapter for the film's story.

References

1928 children's books
1928 short story collections
Children's books adapted into films
Short story collections by A. A. Milne
Children's short story collections
Winnie-the-Pooh books
Books illustrated by E. H. Shepard
Methuen Publishing books
British children's books
Books about bears
Pigs in literature
Books about tigers